The Roman Catholic Diocese of Nantes is a diocese of the Latin Church of the Roman Catholic Church in Nantes, France. The diocese consists of the department of Loire-Atlantique. It has existed since the 4th century. It is now suffragan of the Archdiocese of Rennes, Dol, and Saint-Malo, having previously been suffragan to the Archdiocese of Tours. Its see is Nantes Cathedral in the city of Nantes.

History 

According to late traditions, Saint Clarus (Saint Clair), first Bishop of Nantes, was a disciple of Saint Peter. De la Borderie, however, has shown that the ritual of the Church of Nantes, drawn up by Helius the precentor in 1263, ignores the apostolic mission of Saint Clarus, and also that Saint Peter's nail in Nantes Cathedral was not brought there by Saint Clarus, but at a time subsequent to the invasions of the Northmen in the 10th century. He showed further that Saint Felix, writing with six other bishops in 567 to Saint Radegund, attributed to Saint Martin of Vertou the chief role in the conversion of the Nantais to Christianity, and that the traditions concerning the mission of Saint Clarus are later than 1400.

The earliest list of the bishops of Nantes (made, according to Louis Duchesne, at the beginning of the 10th century) does not favour the thesis of a bishop of Nantes prior to Constantine I. The author of the Passion of the Nantes martyrs, Saints Donatian and Rogatian, places their death in the reign of Constantius Chlorus, and seems to believe that Rogatian could not be baptized, because the bishop was absent. Duchesne believes that the two saints suffered at an earlier date, and disputes the inference of the ancient writer concerning the absence of the bishop. He believes that the first bishop of Nantes, whose date is certain, is Desiderius (453), correspondent of Sulpicius Severus and St. Paulinus of Nola. Several bishops, it is true, occupied the see before him, among others Saint Clarus and Saint Similianus, but their dates are uncertain. Duchesne considers as legendary the Saint Aemilianus supposed to have been Bishop of Nantes in Charlemagne's reign and to have fought the Saracens in Burgundy.

Among the noteworthy bishops are: Saint Felix (550-83), whose municipal improvements at Nantes were praised in the poems of Venantius Fortunatus, and who often mediated between the people of Brittany and the Frankish kings; Saint Pacharius (end of 7th century); Saint Gohard (Gohardus), martyred by the Northmen in 843, with the monks of the monastery of Aindre; Actardus (843–871), during whose time the Breton prince Nominoe, in his conflict with the metropolitan see of Tours, created a see at Guérande, in favour of an ecclesiastic of Vannes, in the heart of the Diocese of Nantes; the preacher Cospeau (1621–36).

The diocese venerates: the monk Saint Hervé (6th century); the hermits Saint Friard and Saint Secondel of Besné (6th century); Saint Victor, hermit at Cambon (6th or 7th century); the English hermit Saint Viaud (7th or 8th century); the Greek Saint Benoît, Abbot of Masserac in Charlemagne's time; Saint Martin of Vertou (d. 601), apostle of the Herbauges district and founder of the Benedictine Vertou Abbey; Saint Hermeland, sent by Lambert, Abbot of Fontenelle, at the end of the 7th century to found on an island in the Loire the great monastery of Aindre (now Indret); the celebrated missionary Saint Amand, Bishop of Maastricht (7th century), a native of the district of Herbauges.

Blessed Françoise d'Amboise (1427–85), who became Duchess of Brittany in 1450, had a great share in the canonization of Saint Vincent Ferrer, rebuilt the choir of the collegiate church of Notre-Dame, and founded at Nantes the monastery of the Poor Clares. Widowed in 1457, she resisted the intrigues of Louis XI, who urged her to contract a second marriage, and in 1468 became a Carmelite nun at Vannes. In 1477, at the request of Sixtus IV, she restored the Benedictine monastery of Couëts, near Nantes. The philosopher Abelard was a native of the diocese. The Abbey of La Meilleraye, founded in 1132, was the beginning of an establishment of Trappist Fathers, who played a part in the agricultural development of the country. The crusades were preached at Nantes by Blessed Robert of Arbrissel, founder of Fontevrault. Charles of Blois won Nantes from his rival Jean de Montfort in 1341. On 8 August 1499, Louis XII married Anne of Brittany at Nantes.

Chateaubriant, a town of the diocese, was a Calvinist centre in the 16th century. The Edict of Nantes (1595), which granted Protestants religious freedom and certain political prerogatives.

In 1665, by order of Louis XIV, Cardinal de Retz was imprisoned in the castle of Nantes, from which he contrived to escape. A college was created at Nantes in 1680 for the education of Irish ecclesiastics. Certain regions of the diocese were, during the Revolution, the scene of the War of La Vendée, waged in defence of religious freedom and to restore royalty. At Savenay in December, 1793, succumbed the remains of the Vendean army, already defeated in the battle of Cholet. The atrocities committed at Nantes by the Terrorist Carrier are well-known.

Four councils were held at Nantes, in 600, 1127, 1264, and 1431. The mausoleum of Francis II, Duke of Brittany, executed in 1507 by Michel Colomb, is one of the finest monuments of the Renaissance. The chief places of pilgrimage of the diocese are: Notre-Dame de Bon Garant at Orvault, a very old pilgrimage, repeatedly made by Francis II, Duke of Brittany; Notre-Dame de Bon Secours at Nantes, a pilgrimage centre which dates back to the 14th century; Notre-Dame de Toutes Aides. Notre-Dame de Miséricorde became a place of pilgrimage in 1026 in memory of the miracle by which the country is said to have been freed from a dragon; the present seat of the pilgrimage is the Church of St. Similien at Nantes.

The Ursulines, founded by Saint Angela Merici, were established at Nantes in 1640. Among the congregations for women originating in the diocese are: the Sisters of Christian Instruction, a teaching order founded in 1820 at Beignon (Diocese of Vannes) by Abbé Deshayes, of which the mother-house was transferred to St-Gildas des Bois in 1828; Sisters of the Immaculate Conception, a teaching and nursing order, founded in 1853 (mother-house at La Haye Mahéas); Franciscan Sisters, founded in 1871 (mother-house at St-Philbert de Grandlieu); Oblate Franciscan Sisters of the Heart of Jesus, founded in 1875 by Sophie Victorine de Gazeau (mother-house at Nantes).

Bishops

To 1000 

c. 280: Saint Clair
c. 310–330: Ennius
c. 330: Saint Similien
c. 374: Eumalius or Evhémère I.
c. 383: Martius
End of 4th century: Arisius
Didier, † c. 444
c. 446: Léon
Euribe, † 461
462 – † c. 472: Nonnechius I.
Cariundus, † c. 475
Cerunius
Clemens or Clément I., † c. 502
511: Epiphane
c. 515 – † 541: Evhémère II.
548 – † 8. June 582: Saint Felix I.
Nonnechius II., † 596.
610–614: Eufronius
c. 614–626: Léobard
c. 630: Saint Pascharius
c. 637: Taurinus
c. 640: Haïco
c. 650: Salapius
c. 703: Agathée
Amelon
c. 725: Émilien
732: Salvius
756–757: Déomart
c. 776 – † c. 800: Odilard
c. 800: Alain
c. 820 – † 833: Atton
834 – † 835: Drutcaire
835–824. June 843: Saint Gonthard
843–846: Actard
851: Gislard
853–871: Actard (again)
872–886: Ermengar
886 – † 5. February 896: Landrain
900 – † 906: Foucher
c. 906: Isayas
907: Adalard
Hoctron
950–958: Herdren
c. 960 – † c. 980: Gauthier I.
987: Judicaël
990: Hugo
992 – † 1005: Hervé

1000 to 1300 

1005 – † 15 October 1041: Gautier II.
1047 – 3 October 1049: Budic, Pudicus († 1050), deposed by Pope Leo IX
1049–1052: Erard, Aerard, Airard
1052 – † 31 July 1079: Quiriac (or Guérec, Guerech, Waroch or Werech)
1079–1111: Benedict
1112: Robert I.
1112 – † 29 October 1140: Brice
1142 – † 1147: Iterius
1147 – † 29 December 1169: Bernard I.
25 December 1170 – † 15 January (1184?): Robert II.
1184 – † 1187: Artur?
1185–1197: Maurice de Blaron (also Bishop of Poitiers), † 29 November 1198
1199 – † 1208: Geoffroi
Gautier III, † 1212?
1213 – † 8 February 1227: Etienne de la Bruyère
1227: Clément II († 8 September 1227)
1228 – † 4 February 1235: Henri I.
1236 – May 1240: Robert III (transferred to Jerusalem)
1240 – † 21 September 1263: Galeran
1264 – † 7 February 1267: Jacques I.
1267 – † October 1277: Guillaume I. de Vern
1278 – † 11 May 1291: Durand
1292 – † 1297: Henri II. de Calestrie
1299–1304: Henri III.
End September 1304 – † 14 February 1337: Daniel Vigier
17 July 1338: Barnabé
1339 – † 24 August (1353?): Olivier Salahadin
20 December 1354 – † 23 February 1366: Robert Paynel
16 March 1366 – 1384: Simon de Langres
4 April 1384 – † 13 September 1391: Jean I. de Montrelais (also Bishop of Vannes)
4 September 1392 – † 8 August (1397?): Bonabius de Rochefort
1397 – † 1404: Bernard du Peyron
1404 – † 17 April 1419: Henri le Barbu (also Bishop of Vannes)
24 August 1419 – † 14 September 1443: Jean II. de Châteaugiron (also Bishop of Saint-Brieuc)
1443–1461: Guillaume II. de Malestroit
19 March 1462 – † 23 February 1477: Amauri d'Acigné
1477: Jacques II. d'Elbiest
1477 – † 12 November 1487: Pierre I. du Chaffault
1 October (1489?) – † August 1493: Robert V. d'Espinay
1495 – † 25 September 1500: Jean III. d'Espinay

1500–1800 

1500–1506: Guillaume Guégen
1507–1511: Robert Guibé (also Bishop of Rennes)
1511–1532: François Hamon
1532–1542: Louis d'Acigné
1542–1550: John, Cardinal of Lorraine
1550–1554: Charles, Cardinal de Bourbon
1554–1562: Antoine de Créquy (also Bishop of Amiens)
1562–1566: Antoine II de Créquy
1566–1594: Philippe du Bec (also Archbishop of Reims)
1596: Jean Dubec-Crespin
1596–1617: Charles de Bourgdneuf de Cucé (also Bishop of Saint-Malo)
1621–1622: Henri de Bourgneuf d'Orgères
1622–1636: Philippe Cospéau (also Bishop of Lisieux)
1636–1667: Gabriel de Beauvau
1668–1677: Gilles de La Baume Le Blanc de La Vallière
1677–1717: Jean-François de Beauvau du Rivau
1717–1723: Louis de La Vergne-Montenard de Tressan (also Archbishop of Rouen)
1723–1746: Christophe-Louis Turpin de Crissé de Sanzay (also Bishop of Rennes)
1746–1775: Pierre Mauclerc de La Mousanchère
1775–1783: Jean-Augustin Frétat de Sarra
1784–1801: Charles-Eutrope de La Laurencie

From 1800 

1802–1813: Jean-Baptiste Duvoisin
1817–1822: Louis-Jules-François-Joseph d'Andigné de Mayneuf
1822–1838: Joseph-Michel-Jean-Baptiste-Paul-Augustin Micolon de Guérines
1838–1848: Jean-François II. de Hercé
1848–1869: Antoine-Matthias-Alexandre Jacquemet
1870–1877: Félix Fournier
1877–1892: Jules François Lecoq
1893–1895: Auguste-Léopold Laroche
1896–1914: Pierre-Emile Rouard
1914–1935: Eugène-Louis-Marie Le Fer de la Motte
1936–1966: Jean-Joseph-Léonce Villepelet
1966–1982: Michel-Louis Vial
1982–1996: Emile Marcus, P.S.S.
1996–2009: Georges Pierre Soubrier, P.S.S.
2009–2019:  Jean-Paul James
2020–present: Laurent Percerou

See also
 Catholic Church in France

References

Sources

External links 
  Centre national des Archives de l'Église de France, L’Épiscopat francais depuis 1919, retrieved: 2016-12-24.
Source
Catholic Hierarchy page 

Nantes
4th-century establishments in Roman Gaul
Nantes
Loire-Atlantique